Birdal is a Turkish surname. Notable people with the surname include:

 Akın Birdal (born 1948), Turkish politician
 Coşkun Birdal (born 1973), Turkish footballer

Turkish-language surnames